SS Birma was a British-built transatlantic passenger ship. She was built in 1894 by Fairfield Shipbuilding and Engineering Company in Govan, United Kingdom, as Arundel Castle and later went through numerous ownership and name changes, including coming into the hands of the Russian American Line. In 1912, Birma was one of the ships to respond to the sinking of RMS Titanic. She was broken up in 1924 following acquisition by a German line after a liquidation sale.

Early history 
Birma was built in Glasgow in 1894, originally as Arundel Castle, for Donald Currie's Castle Mail Packets Company  (later renamed the Union-Castle Line). She made her maiden voyage from London to Port Natal in the Colony of Natal in 1895. In 1905, Arundel Castle was sold to the East Asiatic Company (EAC) in Denmark and renamed Birma. The ship was transferred in 1908 to EAC's associate company, Russian American Line. During this time, Birma was mostly used as a ship working on routes between the United States and the Netherlands.

Titanic 
In April 1912, Birma was sailing from New York to Rotterdam and was fitted with a De Forest Wireless Telegraphy system. On 14 April, the ship received CQD and SOS distress messages from Titanic. Birmas wireless operator, Joseph Cannon, quickly noted down the location, as given by Titanic, of 41°46'N. 50°14'W. He asked what had happened and Titanic responded that they were sinking after having struck an iceberg.  Birmas captain, informed of the situation, relayed a message to the stricken vessel that his ship was 100 nautical miles away and expecting to arrive at the given location at approximately 6:30 am on 15 April. Initially, Birma did not know that the ship in distress was Titanic, as the latter's call sign of "MGY" was so new that it was not in Birmas identification books. They were later informed by the nearby  that "MGY" was Titanic.

Birma eventually reached the given co-ordinates at 7:30 am, but realised the position given by Titanic must be incorrect because of the large amount of pack ice in the vicinity; they were still 13 nautical miles from where Titanic actually sank. Birmas telegraphy room picked up messages from  reporting that they had rescued Titanic survivors, and Birma offered supplies. The response from Carpathia was "shut up". This was attributed by Cannon to be part of a Marconi's Wireless Telegraph Company policy not to provide information to ships that did not use Marconi wireless sets. Further attempts at communication with Carpathia resulted in similar rebuttals aside of a standard Ship's Salute from their flags.  As a result, Birma returned to her planned course and on 15 April, passed what her crew believed to be the iceberg that sank Titanic and photographed it. The crew held a memorial service on board and flew the flags of the United States and Russia at half-mast. Though they did not carry a British flag, the passengers made one and it was also flown at half-mast.

Ships with Marconi sets started passing messages to each other that Birma had picked up five lifeboats, a claim the ship's crew denied. The later British inquiry ignored Birmas testimony, based upon prior testimony from the crew of the Californian who denied hearing Birma being told to "shut up". The American inquiry only briefly considered the charge, to which the general manager of Marconi in the United States responded that it was never company policy or general orders to ignore requests made by non-Marconi ships during emergencies. Copies of telegrams sent by Titanic that were received by Birma relating to the sinking were later placed in The National Archives in the United Kingdom.

Later service and fate 
Birma was renamed Mitava in 1913 by the Russian American Line, who used her as an immigrant ship between Libau and New York. In 1914, she was laid up at Kronstadt during the First World War and remained there for the duration (despite being painted as a hospital ship) and returned to East Asiatic Company ownership after the end of the war. In 1921, the Polish Navigation Company bought her and refitted her with a new name of Josef Pilsudski. The maiden voyage under the new name was planned for later in the year but the ship was impounded in Kiel, Germany, for non-payment of $200,000 worth of repair bills. A German company bought the ship and named it Wilbo after the Polish Navigation Company was liquidated. However, in 1924 Wilbo was broken up in Genoa, Italy.

References 

Ships built in Govan
1894 ships
Ships of the Union-Castle Line
RMS Titanic
Passenger ships of the United Kingdom
Steamships of the United Kingdom
Passenger ships of Denmark
Steamships of Denmark
Passenger ships of Russia
Steamships of Russia
Hospital ships of the Soviet Union and Russia
Hospital ships in World War I
Passenger ships of Danzig
Steamships of Danzig
Passenger ships of Germany
Steamships of Germany